Phyllonorycter ocimellus is a moth of the family Gracillariidae. It is found in eastern and western Kenya in humid, secondary forests at an altitude of about 1,600 meters.

The length of the forewings is 3.1–3.4 mm. The forewing is elongate and the ground colour is dark ochreous, with white markings. The hindwings are greyish fuscous. Adults emerged from mines in mid-April, early May and early November.

The larvae feed as leaf miners on Ocimum gratissimum. The mine has the form of an underside tentiform mine. The mine is opaque, creamy or light brown. Pupation takes place in a white cocoon.

Etymology
The species name is formed from the root of the host plant generic name Ocimum and the Latin suffix –ellus.

References

Endemic moths of Kenya
Moths described in 2012
ocimellus
Moths of Africa

Leaf miners
Taxa named by Jurate de Prins